Riddim Warfare is a 1998 studio album by DJ Spooky. It includes contributions from Sir Menelik, Kool Keith, Killah Priest, Thurston Moore, Ben Neil, Arto Lindsay, and Mariko Mori.

Critical reception
John Bush of AllMusic gave the album 4 stars out of 5, commenting that "Only one man could conceive of an album including turntable battles, a workout for Sonic Youth guitarist Thurston Moore, and a spoken-word piece on the same album." Joshua Klein of The A.V. Club said, "the record is a surprisingly lithe and notably straightforward exercise in hip-hop psychedelia." Marc Weingarten of Vibe called it "the most cohesive and rhythmically righteous album of his career."

Track listing

Personnel
 DJ Spooky – nmbara, wind chimes, gongs, street noises, additional vocals, bass, electric guitar on track 3, acoustic guitar on track 8
 Sir Menelik – vocals on tracks 3, 9
 Kool Keith – vocals on tracks 3, 17
 Akin Atoms – guitar on tracks 4, 14, 20
 Karsh Kale – drums on tracks 4, 14, 20
 Arto Lindsay – guitar on track 7
 Lucio Maia – guitar on track 7
 Dhengue – bass on track 7
 Jorge Du Peixe – drums on track 7
 Gulmar Bola8 – drums on track 7
 Gira – drums on track 7
 Pupilo – drums on track 7
 Toca Ogan – percussion on track 7
 Marcos Matias – percussion on track 7
 Prince Poetry – vocals on track 8
 Pharoah Monch – vocals on track 8
 Vinicius Cantuaria – acoustic guitar on track 8
 Ambassador Jr. – vocals and scratches on track 10
 Grisha Coleman – vocals on track 11
 Killah Priest – vocals on track 13
 Manny Oquendo – keyboard on tracks 14, 20
 Micah Gaugh – saxophone on track 14
 Julia Sher – vocals on track 16
 Thurston Moore – guitar on track 19
 Ben Neil – trumpet on track 20
 Mariko Mori – vocals on track 21

References

External links
 

1998 albums
DJ Spooky albums